Large woody debris (LWD) are the logs, sticks, branches, and other wood that falls into streams and rivers.  This debris can influence the flow and the shape of the stream channel.  Large woody debris, grains, and the shape of the bed of the stream are the three main providers of flow resistance, and are thus, a major influence on the shape of the stream channel. Some stream channels have less LWD than they would naturally because of removal by watershed managers for flood control and aesthetic reasons.
  
The study of woody debris is important for its forestry management implications. Plantation thinning can reduce the potential for recruitment of LWD into proximal streams. The presence of large woody debris is important in the formation of pools which serve as salmon habitat in the Pacific Northwest. Entrainment of the large woody debris in a stream can also cause erosion and scouring around and under the LWD.  The amount of scouring and erosion is determined by the ratio of the diameter of the piece, to the depth of the stream, and the embedding and orientation of the piece.

Influence on stream flow around bends
Large woody debris slow the flow through a bend in the stream, while accelerating flow in the constricted area downstream of the obstruction.

See also
Beaver dam
Coarse woody debris 
Driftwood
Log jam
Stream restoration

References

Dead wood
Hydrology
Forest ecology
Habitat